Indium trihydride is an inorganic compound with the chemical formula. It has been observed in matrix isolation and laser ablation experiments. Gas phase stability has been predicted. The infrared spectrum was obtained in the gas phase by laser ablation of indium in presence of hydrogen gas    InH3 is of no practical importance.

Chemical properties 
Solid InH3 is a three-dimensional network polymeric structure, where In atoms are connected by In-H-In bridging bonds, is suggested to account for the growth of broad infrared bands when samples of InH3 and InD3 produced on a solid hydrogen matrix are warmed. Such a structure is known for solid AlH3.  When heated above , indium trihydride decomposes to produce indium–hydrogen alloy and elemental hydrogen. As of 2013, the only known method of synthesising indium trihydride is the autopolymerisation of indane below .

Other indium hydrides

Several compounds with In-H bonds have been reported. Examples of complexes with two hydride ligands replaced by other ligands are K3[K(Me2SiO)7][HIn(Me3CCH2)3]4 and HIn(2-Me2NCH2-C6H4)2.

Although InH3 is labile, adducts are known with the stoichiometry InH3Ln (n = 1 or 2).
1:1 amine adducts are made by the reaction of LiInH4 with a trialkylammonium salt. The trimethylamine complex is only stable below −30 °C or in dilute solution. The 1:1 and 1:2 complexes with tricyclohexylphosphine (PCy3) have been characterised crystallographically. The average In-H bond length is 168 pm. Indium hydride is also known to form adducts with NHCs.

References 

Indium compounds
Metal hydrides